The Business may refer to:

 The Business (magazine), a British weekly magazine
 The Business (novel), a novel by Iain Banks
 The Business (band), an English punk rock/Oi! band
 The Business (film), a 2005 film directed by Nick Love
 The Business (record store), a record store in Anacortes, WA
 The Business, an RTÉ Radio 1 show presented by John Murray
 The Business, a National Public Radio film industry news digest produced by KCRW
 The Business (TV program), an Australian business program 
 The Business (TV series)
 "The Business" (Yung Berg song), 2008
 "The Business" (Tiësto song), 2020
 The Business – the Definitive Singles Collection, a compilation album by Madness

See also
Business